Stockton South is a constituency represented in the House of Commons of the UK Parliament since December 2019 by Matt Vickers, a Conservative MP.

Boundaries

1983–1997: The Borough of Stockton-on-Tees wards of Bishopsgarth, Egglescliffe, Fairfield, Grangefield, Hartburn, Ingleby Barwick, Mandale, Parkfield, Preston, Stainsby, Victoria, Village, and Yarm, and the Borough of Middlesbrough wards of Ayresome, Brookfield, and Kader.

1997–2010: The Borough of Stockton-on-Tees wards of Bishopsgarth, Egglescliffe, Elm Tree, Fairfield, Grangefield, Hartburn, Ingleby Barwick, Mandale, Parkfield, Preston, Stainsby, Victoria, Village, and Yarm. The three Middlesbrough wards were transferred to the redrawn Middlesbrough constituency.

2010–present: The Borough of Stockton-on-Tees wards of Bishopsgarth and Elm Tree, Eaglescliffe, Fairfield, Grangefield, Hartburn, Ingleby Barwick East, Ingleby Barwick West, Mandale and Victoria, Parkfield and Oxbridge, Stainsby Hill, Thornaby-on-Tees, and Yarm.

Stockton South consists of the south-western half of Stockton-on-Tees and on the same bank, upstream, the town of Eaglescliffe – on the southern bank of the River Tees are the towns of Thornaby-on-Tees, Yarm, and Ingleby Barwick.

History
The seat was formed from a combination of Stockton-on-Tees and Thornaby in 1983, predominantly as a replacement to the latter seat.

Political history
More middle-class than neighbouring Stockton North, this seat was first won by the SDP-Liberal Alliance in a narrow victory at the 1983. Ian Wrigglesworth, the former Labour MP for Thornaby, defected to the newly formed Social Democratic Party in 1981, and held the successor seat as the SDP candidate.

This result came after the Conservative candidate's nomination was withdrawn when he was revealed to have previously been in the National Front.

Following this, the seat was held by a Conservative for ten years, from 1987 to 1997. It was a bellwether in Labour's landslide at the 1997 general election, and its member, Dari Taylor, retained it until the 2010 general election, when the Conservative, James Wharton narrowly won back the seat.

It was the Conservative Party's only gain in the North East, with Wharton substantially increasing his majority at the 2015 general election. However, Labour's victory in the seat in 2017 saw the seat's 30 year status as a bellwether constituency come to an end. In 2019, the Conservatives took it back, in line with the general swing in their favour in multiple north east red wall seats, despite only being held by Labour for fifteen of its 39 years of existence.

Constituency profile
Based on ONS data, workless claimants and registered jobseekers, were in May 2017 lower than the North East average of 5.9% and also lower than the national average of 4.6%, at 3.4% of the population.

Members of Parliament

Elections

Elections in the 2010s

On 11 December 2019, the day before the election, the Liberal Democrat candidate Brendan Devlin endorsed the Labour candidate Paul Williams,
urging people to vote tactically to stop the Conservatives winning the seat. However, Devlin still appeared on the ballot paper and therefore received votes.

Elections in the 2000s

Elections in the 1990s

Elections in the 1980s

See also
 List of parliamentary constituencies in Cleveland
 History of parliamentary constituencies and boundaries in Cleveland
 Opinion polling for the next United Kingdom general election in individual constituencies

Notes

References

Parliamentary constituencies in North East England
Politics of the Borough of Stockton-on-Tees
Constituencies of the Parliament of the United Kingdom established in 1983